Thomas Jefferson High School was a public high school in Fairfax County, Virginia, United States; it had an Alexandria mailing address but was outside of the Alexandria city limits. A part of the Fairfax County Public Schools, it opened in 1964 and closed in 1987.

The school was co-located with the Thomas Jefferson High School for Science and Technology from 1985 to 1987. It stopped accepting new students after 1985, and merged with Annandale High School for the 1987–1988 school year. No students from Jefferson or TJHSST graduated in 1988. Students who had attended TJ from 1984 to 1987 graduated from Annandale HS in 1988.

Notable alumni
 Jay Raymond, First United States Chief of Space Operations
 Vincent K. Brooks, United States Army general
 Dave Grohl, drummer of Scream, Nirvana and Them Crooked Vultures; lead singer and guitarist of Foo Fighters
 Alisa Harvey, American middle-distance runner
 Aaron Hillegass, computer programmer, author and trainer; founder of Big Nerd Ranch
 Scott Norwood, former NFL kicker of the Buffalo Bills; known for missing a field goal attempt wide right at the end of Super Bowl XXV

References

External links 
 Thomas Jefferson High School alumni page 

Defunct schools in Virginia
Educational institutions established in 1964
High schools in Fairfax County, Virginia
Educational institutions disestablished in 1987
1964 establishments in Virginia